Cyanagraea praedator is a species of crab that lives on hydrothermal vents, and the only species in the genus Cyanagraea.

Its haemocyanin has a strong affinity for oxygen, and displays a significant Bohr effect, which is unaffected by lactic acid.

The leech Bathybdella sawyeri has been observed attached to C. praedator.

References

Further reading

External links
Cyanagraea praedator Saint Laurent, 1984, LifeDesks

Crabs
Crustaceans of the eastern Pacific Ocean
Animals living on hydrothermal vents
Monotypic decapod genera